In structural geology, a syncline is a fold with younger layers closer to the center of the structure, whereas an anticline is the inverse of a syncline.   A synclinorium (plural synclinoriums or synclinoria) is a large syncline with superimposed smaller folds.  Synclines are typically a downward fold (synform), termed a synformal syncline (i.e. a trough), but synclines that point upwards can be found when strata have been overturned and folded (an antiformal syncline).

Characteristics
On a geologic map, synclines are recognized as a sequence of rock layers, with the youngest at the fold's center or hinge and with a reverse sequence of the same rock layers on the opposite side of the hinge.  If the fold pattern is circular or elongate, the structure is a basin.  Folds typically form during crustal deformation as the result of compression that accompanies orogenic mountain building.

Notable examples
 Powder River Basin, Wyoming, US
 Sideling Hill roadcut along Interstate 68 in western Maryland, US, where the Rockwell Formation and overlying Purslane Sandstone are exposed
 Forêt de Saou syncline in Saou, France
 The Southland Syncline in the southeastern corner of the South Island of New Zealand, including The Catlins and the Hokonui Hills
 Strathmore Syncline, Scotland
 Wilpena Pound, Flinders Ranges, South Australia
 Fort Valley, Shenandoah County, Virginia
 The Picuris Mountains of New Mexico, US, contain an example of an overturned syncline, the Hondo Syncline.

Gallery

See also
 Anticline
 Homocline
 Monocline
 Ridge-and-Valley Appalachians

References

Structural geology